Beatrix Klein-Szalay (born 19 January 1953) is a Hungarian former professional tennis player.

A native of Budapest, Klein was Hungary's national singles champion in 1976 and represented her country in 10 Federation Cup rubbers. During her career she made three singles main draw appearance at the French Open and qualified for the US Open in 1981. She now lives in New Jersey, where she coaches tennis.

See also
List of Hungary Fed Cup team representatives

References

External links
 
 
 

1953 births
Living people
Hungarian female tennis players
Tennis players from Budapest
Hungarian emigrants to the United States